Urraca Club de Fútbol is a Spanish football club based in Posada de Llanes, Llanes in the autonomous community of Asturias. Urraca plays its home games at Estadio La Corredoria, opened in January 2012 with a game Under-17 teams of Spain and Italy. Spaniards won the game by 5–1. It has a capacity for 1,700 people but only 198 seats, all of them in the main tribune.

History
The first Club Deportivo Urraca was founded on 18 August 1949 and dissolved in the 1950s.

The club was refounded as Urraca Club de Fútbol in 1979 and it finished as last qualified in their first season. After spending all his history at regional divisions, Urraca promoted to Tercera División – Group 2 in May 2012.

Urraca remained five consecutive seasons in Tercera División. In 2019, the club comes back to the fourth tier after winning the Regional Preferente, thus qualifying for the first time to the Copa del Rey thanks to the new competition format implemented since the 2019–20 season.

Season to season

7 seasons in Tercera División
1 season in Tercera División RFEF

Women's team
In December 2014, Urraca CF decided to create a women's team to compete in the Regional league of Asturias. In its first season, the team finished in the 11th position out of 14.

References

External links
Official website 
Club & stadium history from Estadios de España 

Football clubs in Asturias
Association football clubs established in 1979
1979 establishments in Spain